Tigerstyle is a Scottish folkhop group from Glasgow with a British Punjabi background.

Background
Brothers Raj Singh and Pablo (Pops) Singh come from a folk background, with the traditional upbringing of a Sikh family, with their roots in Punjab, Punjabi folk music, in particular Punjabi music from the late 1970s to early 1980s, including artists such as Kuldip Manak and Surinder Shinda as well as Bollywood music. They also list Rap, Hip hop, RnB and Drum n bass with artists such as Dr. Dre and Ice Cube as influences.

Music career
They started their music career in 1997 when as DJs they created Desi Bombsquad Sound System with the intent of nurturing the bhangra scene in Scotland as they felt it lagged behind the English bhangra scene. The name Tigerstyle is taken from the Tiger Style of Shaolin Kung Fu named after the tiger, with the brothers coming from a Sikh warrior background which has its own martial art, Gatka, and the name Singh meaning lion.

The brothers have released a number of singles and albums and also done official remixes for artists such as Lisa Maffia and Raghav. After a legal dispute with previous record companies, they signed to Nachural Records, the label that launched Panjabi MC. 

Tigerstyle have toured all over the world and shared stages with the likes of Lily Allen, Dub Pistols, Misty in Roots, Talvin Singh, Nitin Sawhney, Gunjan, Asian Dub Foundation, Badmarsh & Shri, Truth Hurts, Panjabi MC, Future World Funk as well as Bobby Friction and DJ Nihal on BBC Radio 1. Friction has said of Tigerstyle, "They are without doubt the next Asian/Bhangra act that will break through into the mainstream – it is only a question of time."  On 28 October 2006 they performed on the BBC Electric Proms Asian Network gig.

In the second series of Britain's Got Talent on ITV1 in May 2008, the song used by dance act Signature in their audition and again in their performance in the final was "Nachna Onda Nei", a bhangra remix of Michael Jackson's "Billie Jean" and Queen and David Bowie's "Under Pressure"  featuring Kaka Bhaniawala with covering vocals. As a result of it being featured, it made the top 100 for the first time, spending one week at #62

Tigerstyle are one of the few Asian acts to have ever recorded a live session for the late John Peel. They also performed on the BBC Introducing Stage at Glastonbury Festival in July 2007.
Their Bollywood debut came in the shape of exclusive remixes of "Bas Ek Kinng" and "Bhootni Ke" under the guidance of hit music director Pritam, on the soundtrack of the blockbuster movie of summer 2008, Singh Is Kinng. They also collaborated again with Pritam for Pankaj Kapur's directoral debut Mausam.

Over the past few years Tigerstyle have gone on to work with other Bollywood Music Directors such as Sachin Jigar and Ram Sampath and have also develop a new fusion of Bhangra with Electronic Dance Music which they have named "DigiBhang".

This new fusion style formed the basis of their 2013 album "Digi-Bhang". In the same year they transformed their studio produced album into a Live Band Performance. During the 2013 Edinburgh Fringe Festival, Tigerstyle performed at a one-off event named "DigiBhang Live" at the Assembly Rooms in Edinburgh with their newly formed band.

Discography

Albums

Songs

References

External links
MySpace page
Official Website
Tigerstyle Ay Ha
Digi Bhang – The Musical Hammerblow To The Punjabi Music Industry

Bhangra (music) musical groups
Scottish Sikhs
Punjabi people
Musical groups established in 1997